Pompoï is a town in the Pompoï Department of Balé Province in southern Burkina Faso. It is the capital of the Pompoï Department and the town has a total population of 2,710.

References

External links
Satellite map at Maplandia.com

Populated places in the Boucle du Mouhoun Region
Balé Province